Robert Kearns (1927–2005) was an American engineer, educator and inventor.

Robert Kearns may also refer to:
 Robbie Kearns (born 1971), Australian rugby player
 Robert Kearns (musician), former member of The Bottle Rockets
 Bob Kearns, ran as an independent candidate in Wicklow in 2016

See also
 Robert Kerns (1933–1989), opera singer
 Bob Kerns (1930-1991), member of the Nevada Assembly